Wikoff is a surname. Notable people with the surname include:

Allen T. Wikoff (1825-1902), U.S. Republican politician
Charles A. Wikoff (1837-1898), the most senior ranking American Army officer killed in the Spanish–American War
Henry Wikoff (1811–1884), American traveler and writer
Lester B. Wikoff (1893–1978), U.S. Colonel and Superintendent of Wentworth Military Academy

Bertha Berry (born Bertha Wikoff)(1876–1954) nurse and hospital founder